Manuel Tadeo Llano Massa (born 26 August 1999) is an Argentine professional footballer who plays as a right-back for Miedź Legnica II, on loan from Newell's Old Boys.

Career
Llano began his career at the age of four with Provincial, remaining until the age of twelve when he departed to Club Sarmiento Fundación Leo Messi. In 2014, Llano returned to Provincial. In 2016, Llano headed to Newell's Old Boys; who his father worked for. His first appearance for their academy came during a victory away to Club Pablo VI, which preceded his promotion into the reserves in November 2017. His first-team breakthrough occurred in 2020 under Frank Darío Kudelka, who initially selected him as an unused substitute for a Primera División draw away to Racing Club on 28 February. He penned pro terms in April.

Llano made his senior debut on 28 December in the Copa de la Liga Profesional against Central Córdoba, as he replaced Ángelo Gabrielli at the interval of an eventual 3–1 victory.

On 14 September 2022, he moved on a one-year loan spell to Polish Ekstraklasa club Miedź Legnica, with an option to buy. Ineligible to play for the first team until the window registration period, he officially joined their fourth division reserve side.

Personal life
Llano's father, Hernán, is a football recruiter, working for the likes of Newell's Old Boys and Talleres. He also played football locally, notably appearing for Provincial.

Career statistics
.

Notes

References

External links

1999 births
Living people
Footballers from Rosario, Santa Fe
Argentine footballers
Association football defenders
Argentine Primera División players
Newell's Old Boys footballers
Godoy Cruz Antonio Tomba footballers
Argentine expatriate footballers
Expatriate footballers in Poland
Argentine expatriate sportspeople in Poland